The 2014 Quicken Loans Race for Heroes 500 was a NASCAR Sprint Cup Series stock car race held on November 9, 2014, at Phoenix International Raceway in Avondale, Arizona. Contested over 312 laps, it was the 35th and penultimate race of the 2014 NASCAR Sprint Cup Series season, as well as the ninth race in the Chase for the Sprint Cup. Kevin Harvick dominated the race on his way to scoring the win. Jeff Gordon finished second while Matt Kenseth, Brad Keselowski, and Denny Hamlin rounded out the top five. The top rookies of the race were Kyle Larson (13th), Michael Annett (26th), and Alex Bowman (32nd).

Previous week's race
Jimmie Johnson held off Brad Keselowski and Kevin Harvick to score his 70th career win in the AAA Texas 500. “It's a testament to this team and the fact that we'll never give up,” said Johnson. “We'll always keep fighting and keep trying to make our cars better. We’re not in the Chase and not where we want to be - fighting for the championship.”

Report

Background
Phoenix International Raceway, also known as PIR, is a one-mile, low-banked tri-oval race track located in Avondale, Arizona. The motorsport track opened in 1964 and currently hosts two NASCAR race weekends annually. PIR has also hosted the IndyCar Series, CART, USAC and the Rolex Sports Car Series. The raceway is currently owned and operated by International Speedway Corporation. The raceway was originally constructed with a  road course that ran both inside and outside of the main tri-oval. In 1991 the track was reconfigured with the current  interior layout. PIR has an estimated grandstand seating capacity of around 67,000. Lights were installed around the track in 2004 following the addition of a second annual NASCAR race weekend.

On Friday, the Dover Police Department announced it was conducting a criminal investigation into domestic assault allegations that involves Kurt Busch. The allegations allege that Busch had had an altercation with Patricia Driscoll in his motor coach at Dover International Speedway late September during the weekend of the 2014 AAA 400. The department issued a written statement saying, “The Dover Police Department can confirm that an investigation is being conducted based on an allegation of domestic assault that is alleged to have occurred in the City of Dover involving Mr. Busch. These allegations were brought to the Dover Police Department on Wednesday, November 5th at 2:00PM. At this time, the department is still investigating the victim's claims and will not have any further comment on this matter in order to preserve the integrity of the case. The Dover Police Department will release further information as it becomes available. We appreciate the public's and media's patience in this matter and are confident that the department is taking the proper investigative steps to ensure the case is resolved appropriately." Rusty Hardin, attorney for Busch, said, "The Dover Police Department has been informed that Mr. Busch will fully cooperate with their investigation and he expects to be vindicated when the entire truth of the situation comes to light. This allegation is a complete fabrication by a woman who has refused to accept the end of a relationship and Mr. Busch vehemently denies her allegations in every respect. At this time we intend to have no further comment in the media out of respect for the Dover Police Department’s desire to conduct a thorough investigation without a media circus." NASCAR has commented on the investigation, saying they are “aware of the investigation involving driver Kurt Busch. We recognize the seriousness of this matter and are actively gathering information from all parties, including law enforcement authorities and Stewart-Haas Racing. It would be inappropriate for NASCAR to comment further on this matter until we have more information." Stewart Haas Racing, which has fielded cars for Busch this season, issued a statement saying, “This is an allegation Stewart-Haas Racing takes very seriously but we’re still gathering all of the facts." Kurt Busch will race this weekend.

Practice and qualifying
We’ve got it in our car. We just gotta get for 312 laps now.” "Kevin (Harvick) probably has a 10th on everyone," Kez says. "We probably have a second or third place car." "You're either going to hit a walk off, or you're just going to race next weekend," said Harvick, who is last in the Chase standings and 18 points out of the lead. Clay Rogers failed to qualify for the race.

Race

The race was scheduled to begin at 3:15 PM Eastern time, but started five minutes late at 3:20 when Denny Hamlin led the field to the green flag. Thanks to Kevin Harvick splitting the middle in turn 4, Joey Logano took the lead from Hamlin on lap 25. The first caution of the race flew on lap 31 for debris on the backstretch. Denny Hamlin exited pit road in fourth, but came back down for a flat right-rear tire. David Ragan stayed out to lead two laps before pitting. The race restarted on lap 36 with Logano leading the way. Kevin Harvick took the lead on lap 44. Casey Mears was running twelfth when his right-rear tire blew out on the dogleg, went spinning, made light contact with the inside wall towards turn 3 and brought out the second caution of the race on lap 81. Dale Earnhardt Jr. won the race off pit road by taking two tires and assumed the lead. The race restarted on lap 88. Earnhardt wasn't the leader for long as Kevin Harvick took back the lead on the restart. Debris on the front-stretch brought out the third caution of the race on lap 96. The race restarted on lap 101. The fourth caution of the race flew on lap 123 for debris in turn 1. Joey Logano beat Harvick off pit road, but was forced to restart from the end of the longest line for equipment leaving the pit box. The race restarted on lap 128 with Harvick leading the way. The fifth caution of the race flew on lap 185 after Austin Dillon had a right-front tire blowout in turn 3. The race restarted on lap 192. Debris in turn 1 brought out the sixth caution of the race on lap 201. The race restarted on lap 206 and caution flew for the seventh time after Josh Wise was turned by Ty Dillon and rear-ended the wall in turn 4. The race restarted on lap 212. Kyle Busch got loose in turn 1, tagged the wall in 2 with the right-rear corner panel, came down and clipped Clint Bowyer and sent him head first into the backstretch wall. Cole Whitt also was taken out in an unrelated chain-reaction after rear-ending Casey Mears. These two wrecks brought out the eighth caution of the race. Because of all the bits and pieces on the track in turn 2, the race was red flagged on lap 216. It was lifted after four minutes. The race restarted on lap 221. The ninth caution of the race flew on lap 237 after Jimmie Johnson went high in turn 1 and just rode the wall. The race restarted with 69 laps to go. The tenth caution of the race flew with 68 laps to go when Jamie McMurray was turned in turn 2. The race restarted with 64 laps to go. Debris on the front-stretch brought out the eleventh caution of the race with 25 laps to go. The race restarted with 20 laps to go. The twelfth caution of the race flew with 16 laps to go when Landon Cassill had a left-rear tire blowout and rear-ended the wall in turn 4. Mike Wallace spun out trying to avoid him. The race restarted with twelve laps to go. Kevin Harvick dominated the race to score the victory. "Wow. I guess that's what it feels like to hit a walkoff in extra innings. I mean this thing -- both races here -- has been bad to the bone," Harvick said after winning his fourth race at this 1-mile oval in the last five tries. Harvick would not have made the final four to race for the title without a win. I could tell that we were going to have to win because everybody was running in the front of the pack that we were racing against. I think this says a lot about our team. We had our backs against the wall. We're in victory lane and we get to go on." In the final turn, Ryan Newman sent Kyle Larson into the wall to secure his place in the championship race. “I just gave it my all,” Newman said. “I wasn’t proud of it but did what I had to get to this next round. That little boy has got a lot of things coming in this sport and he used me up like that in a truck at Eldora a couple years ago. From my standpoint, I call it even but I think if he was in my position, he’d have done the same thing.” "Coming to the finish, there were a lot of cars racing really hard,” said Larson today. “I knew (Newman) was right around me and knew he needed to gain some spots to keep from getting eliminated from the Chase. It's a little upsetting he pushed me up to the wall, but I completely understand the situation he was in,” said Larson, “(I) can't fault him for being aggressive there. I think a lot of drivers out here would have done something similar if they were in that position." Kevin Harvick (with the much-needed win), Joey Logano, Denny Hamlin, and Ryan Newman were the four drivers who will race for the championship, which also meant that NASCAR will be having a new Sprint Cup Series champion. Jeff Gordon, Carl Edwards, Brad Keselowski, and Matt Kenseth were the four drivers eliminated.

Results

Qualifying

Race results

Race summary
 8 lead changes among different drivers
 12 cautions for 58 laps; 1 red flag for 4 minutes           
 Time of race: 3:07:13
 Kevin Harvick won his fourth race in 2014

Standings after the race

Drivers' Championship standings

Manufacturers' Championship standings

Note: Only the first sixteen positions are included for the driver standings.

References

Quicken Loans Race for Heroes 500 (Phoenix)
Quicken Loans Race for Heroes 500 (Phoenix)
NASCAR races at Phoenix Raceway
Quicken Loans Race for Heroes 500